Özge Özder (born 1 April 1978) is a Turkish actress best known for her role as Cavidan in series based by classic novel Dudaktan Kalbe, as Emel the comedy drama series Umutsuz Ev Kadınları and as Kıvılcım in Mucize Doktor.

Life and career 
Özder was born in 1978 in Ankara. Her maternal family is of Circassian descent. She founded "Bana Göz Kulak Ol" with Aslı Tandoğan. She finished her middle and high school studies at the Ankara Private Yükseliş College. It was in those years when she first became interested in theatre. In 1996, she passed the conservatory exams and enrolled in Bilkent University, before continuing her education at Hacettepe University State Conservatory. In 2000, she graduated from Ankara State Conservatory with a degree in theatre studies and started her professional career by joining BKM theatre. In 2001, she continued her career on stage.

Between 2004 and 2006, she was a regular on Kanal D's Haziran Gecesi and her portrayal of the character Lale was praised by fans and critics. Her breakthrough came with Show TV's Dudaktan Kalbe, in which she had the role of Princess Cavidan. Despite her successful television and cinema career, she continued her career on stage and in 2005 joined Istanbul City Theatres. For her role in Three Sisters as Natasha, she was given the Bedia Muvahhit, Afife Jale and Sadri Alışık theatre awards. She was nominated for an Afife Jale award for her role as Lena in Leonce and Lena. She was then cast in 2011 in Fox's Umutsuz Ev Kadınları as Emel, a role she continued to play until 2014. She then appeared in the series Kehribar as Adile Yarımcalı. Subsequently, she played the role of Perihan in the Umuda Kelepçe Vurulmaz series for two years. Between 2019 and 2020, she had a leading role in Mucize Doktor, an adaptation of the Korean TV series Good Doctor.

Theatre 
 Twelfth Night: William Shakespeare – Istanbul City Theatres – 2015
 Kes ve Kaç: Peter Horsler – Istanbul City Theatres – 2014
 Lost in Yonkers: Neil Simon – Tiyatrokare – 2013
 Miss Julie: August Strindberg – Talimhane Theatre – 2012
 Play: Samuel Beckett – Istanbul City Theatres – 2012
 No Exit: Jean-Paul Sartre – Istanbul City Theatres – 2011
 Marat/Sade: Peter Weiss – Istanbul City Theatres – 2010
 Leonce and Lena: Georg Büchner – Istanbul City Theatres – 2008
 Three Sisters: Anton Chekhov – Istanbul City Theatres – 2008
 Ceza Kanunu: Ahmet Nuri Sekizinci – Istanbul City Theatres – 2007
 Düş Oyuncakları: Shakespeare Kolaj – Istanbul City Theatres – 2006
 The Father: August Strindberg – Istanbul City Theatres – 2006
 Klaksonlar Borazanlar Bırtlar: Dario Fo – Bakırköy Municipality Theatres – 2004
 Barış Ormanında Yarış: Fikret Terzi – Bakırköy Municipality Theatres – 2003
 A Midsummer Night's Dream: William Shakespeare – Bakırköy Municipality Theatres – 2003
 İki Kişilik Hırgür: Eugène Ionesco – Bakırköy Municipality Theatres – 2002
 Cephede Piknik Yok: Fernando Arrabal – Bakırköy Municipality Theatres – 2002

Filmography 

 Gecenin Ucunda – 2022– (Sara)
 Sadakatsiz – 2020–2022 (Derya)
 Jet Sosyete – 2019 – Sema (episode 43)
 Mucize Doktor – 2019–2020 – Kıvılcım
 Umuda Kelepçe Vurulmaz – 2016–2017 – Perihan
 Kehribar – 2016 – Adele Yarımcalı
 Ulan İstanbul – 2014 – Sevilay Karam
 Umutsuz Ev Kadınları – 2011–2014 – Emel
  Ömre Bedel – 2009–2010 – Aylin
 Dudaktan Kalbe – 2007–2009 – Cavidan Meriçoğlu Gün
 Başka Semtin Çocukları – 2008 Gül
 Sıfır Dediğimde – 2007 Genç Müberra
 Sınav – 2006 – Candan
 İyi ki Varsın – 2006 – Aslı
 Umut Adası
 Emret Komutanım – 2005 – Sultan
 Uy Başuma Gelenler – 2004
 Haziran Gecesi – 2004 – Lale
 İyi Aile Robotu – 2002 – Çağla
 Aşkın Mucizeleri – 2004
 Estağfurullah Yokuşu – 2003 – Didem
 Hayat A.Ş. – 2003
 Çifte Bela – 2001
 Yeditepe İstanbul – 2001 (guest appearance)
 Dadı – 2000
 Sonbahar Kadınları – 1998
 Ferhunde Hanımlar

Discography 
Singles
 Senle Ben (feat. Sinan Güleryüz]) (2018)
 Biz Bize (feat. Sinan Güleryüz) (2019)
 Senle Ben (feat. Sinan Güleryüz, Alican Sandık) [Remix Edition] (2020)
 Gidersen Eğer (feat. Sinan Güleryüz) (2020)
 Gidersen Eğer (feat. Sinan Güleryüz, Alican Sandık) [Remix Edition] (2021)

References

External links 
 
 

1978 births
Actresses from Ankara
Turkish film actresses
Turkish television actresses
Turkish stage actresses
Living people
Hacettepe University Ankara State Conservatory alumni